Śródmieście is a Polish word for "city centre" or "downtown". In particular it may refer to the following designated districts:
 Śródmieście, Warsaw
 Śródmieście, Gdańsk
 Śródmieście, Gdynia
 Śródmieście, Katowice
 Śródmieście, Rybnik
 Śródmieście, Szczecin
 Śródmieście (former district of Szczecin)
 Śródmieście, Wrocław